Climacoceras (from Greek for "ladder horns") is a genus of extinct artiodactyl ungulates that lived in Africa and Europe during the Miocene. The members of Climacoceras were related to giraffes, and the genus was formerly placed within the Giraffidae, but is now placed in the Climacoceratidae, a sister group within the superfamily Giraffoidea. Fossils of the two best known species of Climacoceras, C. africanus and C. gentryi, have both been found in Kenya. C. africanus had ossicones resembling tall, thorn-covered plant stems, while the ossicones of C. gentryi resembled thorny crescents.

The genus was once placed within Palaeomerycidae, then Giraffidae. It is now considered a giraffoid in the family Climacoceratidae, erected by Hamilton.

Other Climacoceratidae genera include Prolibytherium from Egypt and Libya and Orangemeryx from Namibia and South Africa.

References

 MacInnes, D. G. 1936, "A new genus of fossil deer from the Miocene of Africa", Journal of the Linnean Society, Zoology 39: 521–530.
 Hamilton, W. R., 1978, "Cervidae and Palaeomerycidae", 495–508, in Maglio, V. J. & Cooke, H. B. S., (eds.) "Evolution of African mammals", Harvard University Press, Cambridge, Massachusetts & London, England, 1978, xiv-641

Climacoceratidae
Prehistoric even-toed ungulate genera
Miocene even-toed ungulates
Miocene mammals of Africa
Miocene mammals of Europe
Fossil taxa described in 1936